Orana Wildlife Park is New Zealand's only open-range zoo, sitting on 80 hectares of land, located on the outskirts of Christchurch. It opened in 1976, and is owned and operated by the Orana Wildlife Trust, a registered charity. The aims of the Trust are to provide quality recreational opportunities for local people and visitors to Christchurch; conserve endangered native and exotic wildlife; educate visitors (especially children) about environmental and conservation issues; and support research relating to endangered animals.

Orana generates over 95% of its income through gate takings and other trading activities. Fundraising is an essential focus; Orana must separately raise 100% of funds for all capital projects, improvements and animal transfers. Funds have been donated from a variety of sources, including philanthropic trusts, private donors and bequests. As of 2017, over $15M has been raised to develop the Park. All buildings and enclosures except the Great Ape Centre have been built in-house. Many local businesses have assisted in the Park's construction by donating materials, consultancy and equipment.

In 2013 the park suffered a number of setbacks, including an ape escape, snowstorms and wind damage, and was forced to close its doors for 10 days.

In 2015 Orana became home to New Zealand's only gorillas, with three males, including a silverback arriving at the park.

Current Animals 

Orana is currently home to numerous animals from the following species:

	Addax
	African lion
	African wild dog
	American bison
	Black swan
	Black-and-white ruffed lemur
	Black-handed spider monkey
	Brown teal
	Cape crested porcupine
	Cheetah
	Common ostrich
	Common waterbuck
	Crested porcupine
	Egyptian tortoise
	Emu
	Forest gecko
	Giraffe
	Gold-striped gecko
	Helmeted guineafowl
	Kea
	Kererū
	Lace monitor
	Lowland nyala
	Meerkat
	Morepork
	New Zealand bellbird
	Orange-fronted kākāriki
	Plains zebra
	Ring-tailed lemur
	Scimitar-horned oryx
	Shingleback lizard
	Siamang
	Small-clawed otter
	Southern brown kiwi
	Southern white rhinoceros
	Springbok
	Sulphur-crested cockatoo
	Sumatran tiger
	Tasmanian devil
	Tibetan yak
	Tuatara
	Water buffalo
	Western lowland gorilla
	Whio

History and Key Events

1970–1975 

The South Island Zoological Society was formed in 1970.

On 10 September 1976, Orana's first animals arrived from Australia, including 18 lions, 2 tiger cubs, 2 camels and 2 water buffalo. Orana Park (now Orana Wildlife Park) officially opened on 25 September 1976.

1976–1985 
The park opened with 28 animals from six species. During the first ten years of operation, new animals were regularly added and Stage One of the African Plains, a major expansion, was completed.

Upon opening, Orana's main drawcard was the drive-through Lion Reserve, the first and only one of its type in New Zealand. The drive-through Lion Reserve operated from 1976 until 1995. Today, Orana operates a "Lion Encounter" and the experience is an 'historical nod' to the drive-through days.

In 1977, Timber Wolves arrived and the Farmyard was also created. Wolves were a visitor favourite for many years and the interactive Farmyard continues to be popular. In 1978, an island home was created for spider monkeys, the zoo's first species of primate.

Two pairs of rare Scimitar-horned oryx were transferred in 1979. Oryx symbolise what the Park's founders hoped for when Orana was formed. Oryx were declared extinct in the wild in 1984 but captive breeding programmes resulted in the species being re-established in protected areas. Orana was the first institution in the world to breed oryx by artificial insemination and over 80 oryx have been bred at the zoo.

In 1981 Stage One of the African Plains opened. This meant that visitors could view African savannah species, such as zebra and oryx, across water moats.

Giraffes were added in 1982. Orana has contributed to the managed zoo-based programme and over 15 giraffes have been bred, most of which were transferred to other zoos.

The South Island's first kiwi house was created in 1984. Today, Orana plays an important role in the captive component of the recovery programme. Over 20 kiwi from Orana have been released to the wild and chicks have also been transferred to other captive centres.

1986–1995 
Orana's second decade of operation resulted in the steady arrival of new species and ongoing development. The direction of the zoo significantly altered with the closing of the drive-through Lion Reserve in 1995.

White rhinoceros were transferred to Orana in 1986. The addition of tuatara in 1987 commenced a focus on native reptiles that continued the following year with the creation of a new Reptile House. Orana presently maintains a comprehensive public collections of native geckos.

The Park continued to expand with the opening of Stage Two of the African Plains in 1988. This expansion included a new Giraffe House. In 1990, a restaurant was added that has since turned into a Function Centre.

The world's fastest land mammal, the cheetah, arrived in 1988 and since that time Orana has been involved in the zoo-based breeding programme for these swift cats. Cheetah have become one of Orana's flagship conservation species and over 24 cats have been raised to adulthood. Cheetah are a notoriously difficult species to breed in captivity. In 1991, a 'Cheetah Chase' was introduced. This public presentation gave visitors the opportunity to witness the speed of cheetah.

One of the most popular additions to the zoo occurred in 1991 with the arrival of meerkats. Due to a Telecom advertising campaign featuring these animals, visitation for the exhibit opening was one of the biggest days on record. These animals moved into a new exhibit named Kopje Rock which now also features porcupines. Orana has regularly bred meerkats.

A walk-through native bird aviary, complete with waterfall, was opened in 1994. This was built by the South Island Zoological Society. The aviary is home to a wide range of forest birds such as tūī, kererū, kākāriki and bellbird. Recently, tuatara and freshwater crayfish have been added to the aviary.

A significant shift in direction occurred in 1995. The present administration building, and large carpark, was opened. This resulted in the entrance of the zoo moving to middle of the Park. Visitors could no longer drive their cars through Orana. Rather, they walked or utilised a safari shuttle (first introduced in 1986). Scheduled animal feeds occur throughout the day, helping to break up the walking distance for visitors.

Closing the Park to cars also meant the drive-through Lion Reserve ended. The lion pride was relocated to a new habitat close to the new office building. Later, they were moved back to their current location.

1996–2005 
Some significant changes took place including new experiences, the creation of a formal education programme and the acquisition of another attraction.

In 1996 New Zealand whio (blue duck) were added. Whio have become one of the Park's most important conservation species. Orana has regularly bred these highly threatened native birds for release to the wild, in various locations in the North Island.

African wild dogs arrived in 1998. These animals are one of the most threatened African carnivores. Initially Orana held a group of three males and then a pack of seven females.

In 1999, two new animal encounters were added.

Ibutho, New Zealand's first ever rhino calf, was born at Orana in 1999. This was a significant achievement as the reproductive rate of captive born rhinos in zoos is very low. To date, three rhino calves have been bred at Orana (the others in 2010 and 2014).

In 2000, Orana took over the operation of Southern Encounter Aquarium in Cathedral Square, central Christchurch. A kiwi house was added in 2002. The facility was lost in the 2011 Christchurch earthquake.

Asian small clawed otters arrived in 2000. A new habitat, near the meerkats, was created for them. Brown teal, a threatened native species, were added in 2004 and have become a key conservation focus. Pateke ducklings reared at Orana have regularly been released to the wild. The singing Siamang gibbons, Orana's first species of ape, were added in 2004 and three young ones have been raised.

2006–2013 
The return of tigers, a new kea aviary and another zoo to operate were changes. However, earthquakes and storms caused significant damage.

A 6,000 square metre habitat for the critically endangered Sumatran tiger was completed in 2006 and Orana joined 21st Century Tiger. Orana's previous tigers died in 1999.

In October 2008, Orana took over the operation of Nelson's Natureland Zoo. The facility was due to close earlier that year. In December 2008, a new meerkat exhibit was created and a porcupine habitat opened in December 2010. Orana announced in 2012 that they were looking for new owners for Natureland because of financial difficulties; they sold it in 2013.

A walk-through kea habitat opened in 2009. The habitat simulates a regenerating beech forest. Visitors walk along a board-walk and exit through a musterer's hut, the main interpretation hub for the habitat. Four kea chicks have been bred in the aviary.

From 2010 until 2013, the zoo was closed for over 40 days, on nine separate occasions. Orana was fortunate to re-open after the devastating Christchurch earthquakes of 2010 and 2011 with little physical damage. The main impact of the earthquakes was significantly reduced visitation/income as typically 45% of the Park's visitors are from outside of Christchurch.

Orana suffered from a range of further damaging events. These included two floods, three major snow storms causing extensive exhibit damage including a power spike that blew many of the Park's switch boards. Additionally, four gale-force wind events occurred, the most significant of which happened in September 2013 when a severe gale wreaked havoc across Christchurch. This event left the zoo without power, water and communications for 8 days and closed to the public for 10 days. Despite the setbacks, visitor numbers progressively started to recover to pre-quake levels and staff set about creating significant new additions.

2014–2020 
The most significant development was the creation of a Great Ape Centre for New Zealand's only gorillas.

Gypsy horses arrived in 2014. An outreach partnership was formed with Gypsy Royal Stud where Orana's horses are managed as part of the Stud's programme. The horses' arrival started a shift to rare/interesting breeds of domestic stock in the Farmyard.

Orana opened New Zealand's biggest Tasmanian devil habitat in December 2014. The Park joined the Save the Tasmanian Devil Programme raising awareness on these carnivorous marsupials that are threatened due to a contagious cancer.

On 30 July 2015, the park opened the Great Ape Centre at the time it housed 3 gorillas Fataki, Fuzu and Mahali.

2021- 
On 14 May 2021, the youngest gorilla Mahali died.

In 5 June Nyala moved into the park two male (Doctor Bloomfield, Ijeffi) and three female (Masaai, Tsavo and Mopane)

On 31 December 2021 the Zoo announced that it is planning on building a $1.4M White Rhino Conservation Centre.

Exhibits And Future Exhibits

Exhibits 

 Great Ape Centre
 Farmyard

Future exhibits 
A Maud Island Frog Habitat is due to be completed for one of New Zealand's nationally endangered species.

The next major capital project is a New Zealand Native Centre to extend Orana's conservation efforts with native species.

A $1.4M White Rhino Conservation Centre is planned for the park.

Encounter Experiences 

 Lion Encounter
 Hand Feed A Giraffe
 Kiwi Feed/Native Encounter
 Farmyard
 Meet A Rhino
 Tasmanian Devils

Conservation 
Orana is a member of the World Association of Zoos and Aquariums (WAZA), the Zoo Aquarium Association of Australasia (ZAA) and ZAA NZ. Through these memberships, Orana participates in managed breeding programmes for the species they hold.

Native fauna breeding success 
Orana contributes to breed for release recovery programmes for kiwi, blue duck (whio) and brown teal (pateke). To date, over 80 pateke, 50 whio and 23 kiwi from Orana have been released to the wild. Additionally, the Park attracts a range of native species to live in the Park grounds (such as bellbird) through habitat restoration initiatives.

Exotic species success 
Orana participates in 23 zoo-based breeding programmes for endangered species. Success has been achieved over the years with cheetah, scimitar-horned oryx, white rhinoceros and giraffe.

References

External links

1976 establishments in New Zealand
Buildings and structures in Christchurch
Tourist attractions in Christchurch
Zoos in New Zealand
Zoos established in 1976